Vijay Govindarajan (born 18 November 1949), popularly known as VG, is the Coxe Distinguished Professor (a Dartmouth-wide chair) at Dartmouth College's Tuck School of Business and Marvin Bower Fellow, 2015–16 at Harvard Business School. He is a Faculty Partner in the Silicon Valley Incubator Mach49. He worked as General Electric's innovation consultant and professor in residence from 2008 to 2010. He is a New York Times and Wall Street Journal best-selling author and a two-time winner of the McKinsey Award for the best article published in Harvard Business Review. VG was inducted into the Thinkers 50 Hall of Fame in 2019 for his life-long work dedicated to the field of management, strategy, and innovation. VG received Thinkers 50 Distinguished Achievement Awards in two different categories: Breakthrough Idea Award in 2011 and Innovation Award in 2019.

Education
In 1974, Govindarajan received his chartered accountancy degree, where he was awarded the President's gold medal by the Institute of Chartered Accountants of India, the award is given to the first ranked chartered accountancy student in India. Govindarajan went on to earn his M.B.A. from Harvard Business School in 1976 where he graduated with distinction. Two years later, he earned his D.B.A. from Harvard Business School where he was awarded the Robert Bowne Prize For Best Thesis Proposal.

Career
Govindarajan started his career as a professor at the Indian Institute of Management, Ahmedabad where he served as an associate professor from 1978 to 1980. From 1980 to 1985, Govindarajan served as a visiting associate professor at Harvard University and as an associate professor at Ohio State University. In 1985, he joined the Tuck School of Business as a professor, where he has taught ever since. During his time at Tuck, Govindarajan has also served as a visiting professor at INSEAD's Fontainebleau campus and the International University of Japan.

Govindarajan served as General Electric's first Chief Innovation Consultant and Professor in Residence from 2008 to 2010. While working at General Electric, Govindarajan co-authored a paper entitled "How GE Is Disrupting Itself" with Chris Trimble and GE's CEO Jeffrey Immelt. "How GE Is Disrupting Itself," which introduced the idea of reverse innovation.

Scholarly work
Govindarajan is the author of fourteen books and has published articles in academic journals such as the Academy of Management Journal, the Academy of Management Review and the Strategic Management Journal. In 2010, Govindarajan's article "Stop The Innovation Wars" received the second place prize for that year's McKinsey Awards. His article "Engineering Reverse Innovations" won the McKinsey Award for the Best Article published in HBR in 2015.

Awards and honors 
Thinkers 50 Hall of Fame 2019

Thinkers 50 Innovation Award 2019

Best Article Award, Strategic Management Society, 2017

McKinsey Award for The Best HBR Article, 2015, First Place

Thinkers50 Breakthrough Innovation Award recipient

McKinsey Award 2010, 2nd Place

Top Five Most Respected Executive Coach on Strategy

Outstanding Faculty, BusinessWeek Guide to the Best B-Schools, 2003, 2001, 1999, 1997, 1995, 1993

Selected publications
The Three Box Solution: A Strategy For Leading Innovation, HBR Press, April 2016
Reverse Innovation: Create Far From Home, Win Everywhere, Harvard Business Review Press, 2012 (with Chris Trimble). 
“Becoming a Better Corporate Citizen: How PepsiCo Moved Toward A Healthier Future” (with Indra K. Nooyi), Harvard Business Review, March–April 2020.
“Engineering Reverse Innovation”, Harvard Business Review, July-Aug 2015 (with Amos Winter) 
“Building a $300 House for The Poor,” Harvard Business Review, March 2011.
“The CEO’s Role in Business Model Reinvention” Harvard Business Review, January 2011, 89(1- 2), (with Chris Trimble).
“Reverse Innovation, Emerging Markets, and Global Strategy”, Global Strategy Journal, 2011, pp. 191–205. 
“Stop the Innovation Wars” Harvard Business Review, July 2010, 88(7), pp. 76–83 (with Chris Trimble). 
"How GE Is Disrupting Itself," Harvard Business Review, October 2009, 87(10), pp. 56–65 (with Jeffrey Immelt and Chris Trimble).

References

External links

Personal website
Govindarajan's Blog at the Harvard Business Review

Living people
Indian accountants
Harvard University staff
Tuck School of Business faculty
Academic staff of the Indian Institute of Management Ahmedabad
1949 births
Harvard Business School alumni
American academics of Indian descent
Business educators
Indian scholars